"Sing It to You (Dee-Doob-Dee-Doo)" is a 1994 song by South-African singer Lavinia Jones, released as her debut-single by Virgin Records, after 5 years searching for the right producer to release it. It enjoyed moderate success in Europe, peaking at number seven in Austria, number 34 in Scotland, number 45 in the UK and number 52 in Germany, with a total of 19 weeks inside the chart. On the Eurochart Hot 100, it reached number 57. Outside Europe, the song was a huge hit in Israel, peaking at number six. On Music & Media's list of Top 20 Border Breakers 1995, the single reached number 20 in November 1995. In 1998, Jones released "Sing It To You - Part II" with remixes by German DJ/production team Sash!.

Critical reception
Pan-European magazine Music & Media commented, "Because of its similar construction–pop dance with a scatted refrain–the German actress-turned-singer brings back to mind Crystal Waters' 1991 hit Gypsy Woman (La Da Da La Da Dee)." Alan Jones from Music Week wrote, "Neither as catchy or annoying as Crystal Waters' La-da-dee, La-da-da doggerel, Lavinia Jones' Dee-doob-dee-doo refrain is nevertheless an insidious and commercial hook that should pay dividends on her first single, Sing It To You, which straddles the pop/dance divide very nicely." Tim Jeffery from the magazine's RM Dance Update said, "Don't know much about this person but from the sound of it, Lavinia is a Suzanne Vega-type pop singer who's been given the dance mix treatment in an attempt to break her since this pleasant song with its catchy 'dee-doob-dee-doo' scatting sounds a little out of place in the garage context in which it's been put. Still, Deep Recess have done a fine job in creating a good groove with stabbing synths and piano that works well."

Music video
The music video for "Sing It to You" was directed by Thomas Elsner & Sarkis Gazaryan.

Track listing

Charts

References

External links
 Official Website

1994 debut singles
1994 songs
Virgin Records singles
Eurodance songs